Seton Village is a National Historic Landmark District in a rural residential area south of Santa Fe in Santa Fe County, New Mexico, United States. It encompasses a residential settlement and educational facility established in 1930 by Ernest Thompson Seton (1860-1946), an educator and conservationist best known as a founder of the Boy Scouts of America. The district includes the remains of Seton's 32-room home and other residential and educational buildings constructed mostly between 1930 and 1945. It was declared a National Historic Landmark in 1965.

Description
The village has a central plaza, ringed by adobe residences and community buildings. To the east of the plaza stand the remains of Seton's 32-room castle, which burned during restoration in 2005. Distinctive structures in the village include two buildings that were built around railroad cars that Seton brought to the site. Stripped of their interiors, the two cars were finished plaster on the inside, and had adobe walls built around them. One of these buildings has since had the car removed from its inside.

Seton Castle

Seton began designing and building his castle in 1933. The 32-room, 6,900 square foot (640 m2) multi-level building had a flat-roof and rough hewn stone wall exterior. The interior had oak floors and plaster walls with the ceilings supported by log rafters. The Castle was built on one of the highest points on Seton's property, with views over his village and the western landscape.

Community activities

The Village was home to the Seton Institute, including the Woodcraft League and the College of Indian Wisdom, which provided Woodcraft and Scouting leaders with a variety of training opportunities. The Institute closed at the outbreak of World War II.

At Seton's invitation, Maurice and Marceil Taylor moved their printing equipment to New Mexico in 1938 and set up the Seton Village Press. The Village Press closed in 1943, also because of the war.

Seton Village today
Seton Village is designated a National Historic Landmark and a New Mexico State Cultural Property.  The Academy for the Love of Learning, an educational organization which owns the property, preserved the castle ruins as a "contemplative garden." The Academy's Seton Legacy Project maintains a collection of art and archives pertaining to Ernest Thompson Seton. The Academy Campus, including the Seton art gallery, opened in 2011.

The village has a view of the Jemez Mountains and Mount Taylor.

Education
It is within Santa Fe Public Schools.

See also

National Register of Historic Places listings in Santa Fe County, New Mexico
List of National Historic Landmarks in New Mexico

References

External links

 Academy for the Love of Learning
 Seton Village site at the NPS
 Ernest Thompson Seton Institute
 http://www.stateparks.com/seton_village.html
 Seton Village Press

National Historic Landmarks in New Mexico
Geography of Santa Fe County, New Mexico
History of Santa Fe County, New Mexico
Historic American Buildings Survey in New Mexico
Historic districts on the National Register of Historic Places in New Mexico
National Register of Historic Places in Santa Fe, New Mexico
Unincorporated communities in Santa Fe County, New Mexico
National Register of Historic Places in Santa Fe County, New Mexico
Unincorporated communities in New Mexico